Victor Joseph Carapazza (born July 6, 1979) is an American Major League Baseball umpire.  He wears uniform number 19, and previously wore uniform number 85.

Personal life
Carapazza was born in Port Jefferson, New York. In 1998 he graduated from Countryside High School in Clearwater, Florida. Prior to becoming an umpire Carapazza served in the United States Air Force. He has four daughters with his wife Stephanie and is the son-in-law of former American League umpire Rich Garcia.

Umpiring career

From 2003 until 2012 Carapazza was an umpire with several minor leagues, including the International League. He began umpiring Major League Spring Training in 2009.

Carapazza made his Major League Baseball umpiring debut on April 9, 2010, in St. Petersburg, Florida as the Tampa Bay Rays defeated the New York Yankees 9–3, working third base in that game. He umpired in 29 games in 2010, and returned in 2011, umpiring in 133 games.

Carapazza was hired to the full-time Major League Baseball staff in early January 2013.

He served as the right-field umpire during the 2014 Major League Baseball All-Star Game, marking his first such assignment. Carapazza also umpired in the 2014 National League Division Series, and in Game 2 he ejected Washington Nationals second baseman Asdrúbal Cabrera and manager Matt Williams in the 10th inning for arguing balls and strikes.

Carapazza faced controversy after a game on July 1, 2016, between the Toronto Blue Jays and Cleveland Indians. Blue Jay fans booed Carapazza in response to calls made during the 2015 American League Division Series. Carapazza went on to eject Blue Jay players Russell Martin, Edwin Encarnacion, manager John Gibbons, and called 9 Jays out-on-strikes, compared to only 1 of the visiting Indians.

Carapazza has called three consecutive American League Division Series (2015, 2016, 2017).

For the 2018 regular season he was found to be a Top 10 performing home plate umpire in terms of accuracy in calling balls and strikes. His error rate was 8.05 percent. This was based on a study conducted at Boston University where 372,442 pitches were culled and analyzed. 

Carapazza was the home plate umpire for Joe Musgrove's no-hitter on April 9, 2021.

See also 

 List of Major League Baseball umpires

References

External links
 
 SBRForum.com: MLB Baseball : Vic Carapazza
 The Baseball Cube

1979 births
Living people
Baseball people from New York (state)
Major League Baseball umpires
People from Port Jefferson, New York
United States Air Force airmen
Sportspeople from Nassau County, New York